The 2013 Dubai Sevens was the first tournament within the 2013-14 Sevens World Series. It was held over the weekend of 28–29 November 2013 at The Sevens Stadium in Dubai.

Format
The teams were drawn into three pools of four teams each. Each team played everyone in their pool one time. The top two teams from each pool advanced to the Cup/Plate brackets while the top 2 third place teams will also compete in the Cup/Plate. The rest of the teams from each group went to the Bowl brackets.

Teams
The participating teams and schedule were announced on 23 October 2013.

Pool Stage

Pool A

Pool B

Pool C

Knockout stage

Bowl

Plate

Cup

References

External links
Official website

2013-14
2013–14 IRB Women's Sevens World Series
rugby union
2013 in women's rugby union
2013 rugby sevens competitions
2013 in Asian rugby union